Dobbs Ferry station is a commuter rail stop on the Metro-North Railroad's Hudson Line, located in Dobbs Ferry, New York.

History

Dobbs Ferry station opened on September 29, 1849 with its origins as part of the Hudson River Railroad. The current station house, which was built in 1889 by the New York Central and Hudson River Railroad, became a Penn Central station upon the merger between NYC and Pennsylvania Railroad in 1968 like many NYCRR stations in Westchester County, until it was taken over by Conrail in 1976, and then by Metro-North Railroad in 1983. It was restored between 2006 and 2008 by Metro-North. The station house is now a local bar and grille.

Station layout
The station has two slightly offset high-level side platforms–each eight cars long. The two inner tracks not next to either platform are used by express trains, one of which does not include a third rail.

References

External links

Dobbs Ferry Metro-North Station (TheSubwayNut)
 Station House from Google Maps Street View
 North entrance from Google Maps Street View

Metro-North Railroad stations in New York (state)
Former New York Central Railroad stations
Railway stations in Westchester County, New York
Railway stations in the United States opened in 1849
1849 establishments in New York (state)